The Happy Creek Formation is a geologic formation in Nevada, United States. It preserves fossils dating back to the Permian period.

See also

 List of fossiliferous stratigraphic units in Nevada
 Paleontology in Nevada

References
 

Permian geology of Nevada